St John the Evangelist — also known as St John's — off Crown Street is a Scottish Episcopal Church in Aberdeen, Scotland.

History

The Episcopal congregation  in Aberdeen that became St John's Church began when the Kirk of St Nicholas ejected Rev Dr George Garden in 1693 for refusing to conform to the Presbyterian Establishment. After a spell in exile, he returned to Aberdeen by 1720 and gathered around him the remnants of his flock.

Over the next one hundred and thirty years, the congregation met in several houses and a larger building in Golden Square, dedicated to St John the Evangelist.

Present Church
During the long incumbency of Rev. Patrick Cheyne, a new building off Crown Street, was built to the designs of Mackenzie and Matthews, 1849–51. It was consecrated  by the Primus of the Scottish Episcopal Church, Bishop William Skinner and opened for worship on 6 May 1851. The congregation has worshipped there continuously since. The church is now listed as category B by Historic Environment Scotland.

Cheyne was prosecuted in 1858 by Bishop Thomas Suther for his Tractarian "Six Sermons" on the Eucharist. His successor, the Rev. Frederick G Lee  soon resigned to found a new congregation, St Mary's Carden Place, and the Patrons, Dr George Grub and Dr George Ogilvie beseeched John Comper to come to Aberdeen in 1861.

During the first years of Comper's incumbency a day school was built, dedicated to  Cheyne's forty years association with St John's, then in the year 1863 the first sister arrived from the Society of Saint Margaret, the foundress of St Margaret's Convent, 17 Spital, Aberdeen.

Comper resigned the charge at St John's in 1870 to spend more time in his new mission located in the Gallowgate slums of Aberdeen (now St Margaret of Scotland, Aberdeen). The reredos of St John's was designed by Sir Ninian Comper in memory of his parents.

In 2013 the church became the first in Scotland to invite Muslims to share its building  as the neighbouring mosque was so small that some were forced to worship outside.

References

Churches in Aberdeen
Episcopal church buildings in Scotland
Category B listed buildings in Aberdeen
Listed churches in Scotland
Religious organizations established in 1693
Churches completed in 1851
Gothic Revival church buildings in Scotland